France 98 is an association founded by the French footballers who won the 1998 FIFA World Cup. They organise charity and testimonial matches for former players.

Didier Deschamps is the president of the association. Aimé Jacquet acts as the head coach whenever there is a game. The players are for the most part those who took part in the 1998 World Cup and Euro 2000 victorious campaigns.

Matches played

First match
Organiser: Laurent Blanc

On November 4, 2002 in Nîmes against Marseille, to raise money for the victims of the floods in south-eastern France in September 2002. The match ended up in a 1–4 loss for France 98.

Second match
Organiser: Zinedine Zidane

On October 6, 2003 in Marseille against Marseille, to raise money for the victims of the 2003 Boumerdès earthquake in Algeria and those of fires in south-eastern France. The match ended up in a 1–1 draw.

Third match
Organiser: Bixente Lizarazu

Fourth match
Organiser: Fabien Barthez

On May 30, 2005 in Toulouse against Toulouse, to raise money for the victims of the explosion of chemical factory AZF. The match ended up in a 1–2 loss for France 98, with Daniel Moreira playing for both teams during the match.

Fifth match
Organiser: Pascal Vahirua

On May 26, 2008 in Tahiti for Pascal Vahirua's testimonial match against a selection of « friends of Pascal Vahirua's », mostly Tahitian players. The match ended up in a 3–3 draw.

Sixth match
Organiser: Christian Karembeu

On May 31, 2008 in Nouméa for Christian Karembeu's testimonial match against Team Karembeu, composed for the most part of Karembeu's Melanesian friends. The match ended up in an 8–2 victory for France 98.

Seventh match
On July 12, 2008 in the Stade de France (Saint-Denis) for the tenth anniversary of the win in the World Cup final. France 98 played a World selection in front of over 80,000 spectators. The match ended up in a 3–3 draw.

Eighth match
On July 29, 2015 at the Stade Mayol in Toulon to benefit a local children's charity, France 98 played European Rugby Champions Cup winners RC Toulonnais in a match with one football half and one rugby union half. Toulon had previously played one such charity match in 2013 against Olympique de Marseille at the same venue. France 98 won the football half 6-3, but Toulon won the rugby union half 30-20 to win 33-26 overall. Former France rugby union coach Bernard Laporte served as one of the referees.

Ninth match
On June 12th, 2018 at the Paris La Défense Arena (U Arena) in Nanterre for the twentieth anniversary of the World Cup victory. France 98 played a FIFA 98 team coached by Arsène Wenger and won 3-2 after Vincent Candela's winner following goals from (in order) Fernando Morientes, Henry, Zidane and Gaizka Mendieta. The match was also broadcast in full on TF1.

Trophée d'honneur
On May 11, 2008, France 98 were awarded the Trophée d'honneur during the Trophées UNFP du football ceremony to commemorate the tenth anniversary of the World Cup victory.

References

External links
 France 98

Charities based in France
France national football team
France at the 1998 FIFA World Cup